Arizona Express is a 1924 American silent crime drama film directed by Tom Buckingham and starring Pauline Starke and Evelyn Brent.

Plot
As described in a film magazine review, David Keith, although engaged to a young woman of the town, comes to love Lola Nichols, a cabaret dancer who pretends to love him in order to obtain information on the layout of a bank that she and her gang intend to rob. When Keith's uncle discovers the plan, he is killed by one of the woman's confederates. Keith is accused of the murder and sent to prison. Just a few minutes before he is set to be executed, he is pardoned by the governor through the efforts of his sister Katherine and her sweetheart Steve, who have secured evidence that establishes his innocence.

Cast

Preservation
Prints of The Arizona Express survive in the Museum of Modern Art.

References

Bibliography
 Solomon, Aubrey. The Fox Film Corporation, 1915-1935: A History and Filmography. McFarland, 2011.

External links

Review at silentsaregolden.com

1924 films
1924 crime drama films
American crime drama films
American silent feature films
American black-and-white films
Films directed by Tom Buckingham
Fox Film films
1920s American films
Silent American drama films